FME, also known as Feature Manipulation Engine, is a geospatial extract, transformation and load software platform developed and maintained by Safe Software of British Columbia, Canada.  FME was first released in 1996, and evolved out of a successful bid by the founders of Safe Software, Don Murray and Dale Lutz, for a Canadian Government contract to monitor logging activities.

Software 
The base product is FME Desktop; this is a standalone software package with an interface that enables the user to graphically build workflows for data translation, automation, and format and coordinate conversion.  FME Server is an 'on premise' solution that permits on demand server based instantiations of tailored FME workflows.  FME Cloud is similar to FME Server however is hosted 'as needed' in the AWS Cloud.

FME data transformation workflows typically consist of a combination of the following 'building blocks':
 Readers to input from single or multiple data sources in a variety of formats or databases.
 Transformers to manipulate, transform and analyse the data.
 Writers to output the data in a number of different formats.
Any number of readers, writers and transformers can be used in an FME workflow.  A further tool is the Data Inspector, which can present spatial workflow results in a cartographic display.

The ArcGIS Pro software can use the FME engine and workflows as part of the data interoperability extension.  In 2015 the FME software was integrated with the What3Words geolocation system.

Use Base 
As of November 2022, FME has an estimated 0.32% of the total data integration software market.  The Information Technology, governmental, utilities, and oil and gas sectors form the largest organisational user base.  Examples of the use of FME include routing for emergency fire response, and backend data quality management and sub-surface modelling for infrastructure projects.

Criticism and Reviews 
FME is considered a comprehensive platform for BIM data exchange and support of spatial data.  Reviews indicate it is strong in the analytic, conversion and interoperability areas, flexible in scope, with a strong user community.  However, the cartographic capability is considered poor, interactive editing tools are absent, and the licensing costs are seen as significant.

See also 
 Geographic information system software
 QGIS
 GDAL
 ArcGIS

References

External links 
 Safe Software

GIS software
1996 software